The sixth season of the American competitive reality television series MasterChef premiered on Fox on May 20, 2015 and concluded on September 16, 2015.

Gordon Ramsay and Graham Elliot returned as judges. Joe Bastianich left the show after five seasons and was replaced by Christina Tosi.

The season was won by Claudia Sandoval, with Derrick Peltz becoming the runner-up.

Top 22
Source for names, hometowns, and occupations. Ages and nicknames as given on air or stated in cites.

Elimination table

 (WINNER) This cook won the competition.
 (RUNNER-UP) This cook finished in second place.
 (WIN) The cook won the individual challenge (Mystery Box Challenge or Elimination Test).
 (WIN) The cook was on the winning team in the Team Challenge and directly advanced to the next round.
 (HIGH) The cook was one of the top entries in the individual challenge but didn't win.
 (IN) The cook wasn't selected as a top or bottom entry in an individual challenge.
 (IN) The cook wasn't selected as a top or bottom entry in a team challenge.
 (IMM) The cook didn't have to compete in that round of the competition and was safe from elimination.
 (IMM) The cook was selected by Mystery Box Challenge winner and didn't have to compete in the Elimination Test.
 (PT) The cook was on the losing team in the Team Challenge, competed in the Pressure Test, and advanced.
 (NPT) The cook was on the losing team in the Team Challenge, did not compete in the Pressure Test, and advanced.
 (LOW) The cook was one of the bottom entries in an individual challenge or Pressure Test, and advanced.
 (LOW) The cook was one of the bottom entries in the Team Challenge, and advanced.
 (WDR) The cook withdrew from the competition.
 (ELIM) The cook was eliminated from MasterChef.

Guest appearances
 Leslie Gilliams - Episode 8
 Daniel McGuffey - Episode 8
 Ahran Cho - Episode 8
 Becky Reams - Episode 8
 Felix Fang - Episode 8
 Christine Ha - Episode 17
 Luca Manfé - Episode 17
 Courtney Lapresi - Episode 17

Episodes

Ratings

U.S. Nielsen ratings

References

2015 American television seasons
MasterChef (American TV series)